Labasa is a town in Fiji with a population of 27,949 at the most recent census held in 2007.

Labasa is located in Macuata Province, in the north-eastern part of the island of Vanua Levu, and is the largest town on the island. The town itself is located on a delta formed by three rivers – the Wailevu, the Labasa (after which the town is named), and the Qawa. The latter two are connected by an 8-kilometre canal.  The township historically served the sugar cane farms and farm workers with harvesting season resulting in significant seasonal employment, although the township is now less dependent on the sugar industry. The farmers' market offers seasonal produce and seafood. The main street is lined with small family run businesses, supermarkets and restaurants offering a lively pedestrian thoroughfare.

Demographics & Culture
Labasa is heavily Indo-Fijian, and downtown Labasa is consequently filled with curry houses and sari shops. It is the fourth-largest city in Fiji.

Known as the Friendly North for its warm, hospitable culture, Labasa is home to the popular Festival of the Friendly North, which has run for over 40 years and has resulted in over 1.3 million in charitable projects in the region.

Economic activities

The surrounding areas of Labasa are mostly farming areas, which contribute to much of the industry in the town.  The largest crop grown is sugar cane.  The large Fiji Sugar Corporation sugar mill on the outskirts of Labasa town is the only such mill on the island. 

Recently, due to political changes and loss of overseas markets, sugar cane farming and production has been steadily decreasing.  This has been reflected in the increasing migration of people to the main island of Viti Levu, in search of employment opportunities.

Labasa Hospital is the referral center for all health centers and hospital on the island of Vanua Levu, and has recently been expanded.

Labasa is generally an agricultural town, off the tourist track. The Labasa Airport is located in Waiqele about 7km from the town centre with multiple daily domestic flights to Nausori and Nadi international airports. Passenger ferry connections require an overland trip to either Nabouwalu or Savusavu. Labasa has a couple of hotels to stay in (Takia/Travel Lodge and Grand Eastern Hotel). There is at least one movie theatre and several restaurants in the main street providing a range of local and Chinese flavours. 

There is a fairly large market towards the end of the town where one can buy and sample a range of foods, spices, fish, poultry, goats and other local products. A large taxi stand and a bus stop is also by the market.

It also has some popular tourist spots while the people of Labasa are quite well known for their hospitality.

Sports
Labasa is a soccer loving town. 
The Labasa soccer team is known as the "Babasiga Lions" and play their home games at Subrail Park. Its most famous talent is Roy Krishna, born and bred in Siberia, a farming community about five kilometres from Labasa town. Roy Krishna is also Fiji's flag bearer to the 2019 Pacific Games held in Samoa.

Labasa FC prides itself for having featured prodigious talents such as Ivor Evans, Simon Peters and Taniela Tuilevuka.

Labasa and Fiji soccer legend, Simon Peters, was known as the Maradona of Fiji soccer.

The former national soccer striker died at his Labasa home in 2009 a day after his son Misaele Draunibaka was selected to be part of the national Under 20 team.
The former Labasa striker and military officer began his soccer career at 17 in 1987 after being chosen to play for the national U20 team alongside Maritino Nemani, Ravuama Madigi, Abdul Mannan and Raymond Stoddart.

He was also a member of the national team that defeated Australia in 1988, later won gold in the 1991 South Pacific Games.

His peer Ravuama Madigi said this about him: A very obedient man who demonstrated his discipline on and off the field. His disciplined military background is what helps Simon a lot during our soccer days. He is a role model to many of us who played with him since the u20 grade in 1987.
He never gives up or loses hope and always keeps on fighting for the best.
A soft-spoken and humble gentleman whom many players learnt self respect and discipline from.
He should be a role model to Fiji soccer and to the current and upcoming players; following Simon's footsteps could lead to a far better soccer career for many of our youths if they want to succeed.

Raymond Stoddart, a National soccer broadcaster Stoddard said: The most special thing for Simon during his soccer days is his footwork. It is a delight to watch.
Whenever he takes the ball, the public watching the game know what he is going to do with it.
He has got a caliber that current players should follow if they want to be successful strikers.
His ball control skills speed and game finishing is what make Simon counts.
In Fiji, and across the South Pacific, Simon 'Maradona' Peters was one of the deadliest finishers known in his playing days.

Local government
Incorporated as a town in 1939, Labasa is governed by a 12-member town council, whose members elect a Mayor from among themselves.  Councillors serve three-year terms; the Mayor's term is for one year, but may be extended any number of times.  Labasa's current Mayor, elected on 28 October 2005 following the municipal election to the town council one week earlier, is Dr Pradeep Singh of the Fiji Labour Party (FLP). Leslie Williams was chosen as his deputy, but was replaced by Shivlal Nagindas on 30 October 2006.

In 2009, the Military-backed interim government dismissed all municipal governments throughout Fiji and appointed special administrators to run the urban areas. As of 2015, elected municipal government has not been restored. The special administrator of Labasa, along with nearby Savusavu, is Vijay Chand.

Notable people
Roy Krishna, footballer
Kameli Soejima, rugby union player
Semi Valemei, rugby league player

References

Macuata Province
Populated places in Fiji
Vanua Levu